Hitchin Up Yard is a small stabling point located in Hitchin, Hertfordshire, England. It is situated next to the East Coast Main Line and is just north of Hitchin station.

Present 
Great Northern occasionally stables commuter trains there, including Class 365 and Class 313 units.

A Great Northern train driver depot is located near the station on the down side of the ECML.

References 

Rail transport in Hertfordshire
Railway sidings in England
Train driver depots in England